Lydia Ourahmane (born 1992, Saïda, Algeria) is a multi-disciplinary artist based in Algiers and Barcelona.

Her work has been exhibited internationally since she graduated from Goldsmiths University London in 2014. 

Ourahmane's research-driven practice spans spirituality, contemporary geopolitics, migration, and the complex histories of colonialism. She incorporates video, sound, performance, sculpture, and installation on an often large or monumental scale that has consequences beyond the walls of her exhibitions. Drawing on personal and collective narratives and experiences, Ourahmane challenges broader institutional structures such as surveillance, logistics and bureaucratic processes, and the ways these forces are registered. Her recent solo exhibitions include; Tassili, SculptureCenter, NY, Fondation Louis Vuitton, Paris and Mercer Union, Toronto (2022-2023), Survival in the afterlife, Portikus, Frankfurt and De Appel, Amsterdam (2021); Barzakh, Kunsthalle Basel, Triangle – Astérides, Marseille, S.M.A.K. Ghent (2021-2022); صرخة شمسیة Solar Cry, Wattis Institute for Contemporary Arts, San Francisco (2020); and The you in us, Chisenhale Gallery, London (2018), among others.

Her work was included in the 15th Istanbul Biennial (2017), 34th Bienal de São Paulo (2021), New Museum Triennial and Manifesta 12, Palermo (2018).

In 2018 she presented Music for Two Seas an underwater sound work in the coast of Stromboli with collaborator Nicolas Jaar. With collaborator Alex Ayed, she presented Laws of Confusion at Renaissance Society, Chicago (2021) and was included in Risquons-Tout, WIELS Contemporary Art Center, Brussels (2020). On 1st October 2022 she presented sync a 24-hour performance at the KW Institute for Contemporary Art, Berlin in collaboration with artist Daniel Blumberg.

References 

21st-century Algerian artists
1992 births
Living people
Algerian women artists
People from Saïda
Algerian expatriates in the United Kingdom
Alumni of Goldsmiths, University of London